

Karen Page

Paibok

Doctor Paine
Doctor Paine are two fictional characters appearing in American comic books published by Marvel Comics.

Thaddeus Paine
Dr. Thaddeus Paine, created by Len Kaminski, first appeared in Morbius the Living Vampire #4 (December 1994). He is a sadist who is unable to feel pain and has prosthesic hands equipped with surgical tools. He is a silent partner of Dr. David Langford which got threatened, resulting in the deaths of Martine Bancroft and his business partner. Paine then experiments on Morbius, the Living Vampire much like his inhumane medical experiments on the homeless, resulting in the Living Vampire vengefully destroying his facility while the Doctor escaped. Paine next tortured Eddie Brock and experimented on the Venom symbiote, resulting in both individuals as Venom getting revenge by imbalancing his brain.

Erich Paine
Dr. Erich Paine, created by Peter Milligan and Salvador Larroca, first appeared in X-Men (vol. 2) #175 (November 2005). He is a genetics specialist who specialized in genetic mutations which turn humans into mutates to serve as slaves which the X-Men tore down. However, Paine worked under the Nigandan Government's monarchial overlord M'Butu which incurred the Black Panther. Having modified himself into an artificial mutant, Paine managed to hold his own until he's killed by the Red Ghost.

Paladin

Pandemic

Paradigm

Paralyzer

Paris

Benjy Parker

Ben Parker

Kaine Parker

May Parker

Richard and Mary Parker

Teresa Parker
Teresa Parker (also addressed to as Teresa Durand) is the long lost younger sister of Peter Parker and daughter of Richard and Mary Parker. The character first appeared in Amazing Spider-Man: Family Business #1 (April 2014). After their parents' deaths, Peter was sent to live with their Aunt May and Uncle Ben while Teresa, whose birth had been kept a secret, was adopted. Many years later, Teresa was personally recruited into the C.I.A. by Nick Fury. Teresa first came into Peter's life after saving the latter from several mysterious gunmen sent by the Kingpin.

Following this adventure, Teresa left the C.I.A. to join a S.H.I.E.L.D. division called the Gray Blade under Nick Fury Jr., specializing in international hostage rescues and intel gathering, before becoming a fugitive after learning of a program named "Project Twilight", an exhaustive plan to take down both superheroes and supervillains. After deleting all traces of the project from Gray Blade's systems and hiding the only known backup in nanobots in her bloodstream, Teresa sought Peter's assistance in confronting the Kingpin once again, who was involved in the operation. Later on, she helped Spider-Man stop an attack by the Vulture. Since Teresa had been spotted by Gray Blade operatives with Spider-Man, they arrested Peter himself due to his alter-ego being supposedly a bodyguard. When Peter then attempts to get Teresa out of New York, they are attacked by numerous criminals sent by the Tinkerer, ahead of an alien armada.

After traveling to the past of an alternate timeline, to retrieve information to stop the coming invasion. Teresa joined Peter in this journey, contacting Fury and confirming that she was in fact the Parkers' daughter and Peter's sister. After returning to find an alternate timeline where Peter quit being Spider-Man, Teresa joins forces with Peter in restoring the correct timeline. Peter then-after finally introduces Teresa to Aunt May. Months later, her S.H.I.E.L.D. partner and lover David Albright is apparently been tortured and murdered by the Chameleon for information, then-after which point Teresa seeks Peter's help to help find, intercepted a meeting with "The Foreigner", whom had used Albright's information to acquire doses of the Infinity Formula to help Silver Sable's efforts to save Symkaria from its newest civil war. Despite learning of the Chameleon's noble motives and Albright's corruption, Teresa flees in pursuit, leaving Peter alone, apprehending Chameleon after the fall of Doctor Doom.

Teresa later visits The Chameleon at the prison he is serving time in, and discovers he was one of many similar agents trained in a special facility by Finisher, the man who arranged the murder of Richard and Mary Parker, who is revealed to be alive and well. It is implied in the ensuing conversation that Teresa might possibly be a Chameleon agent herself. The Finisher offers to reveal to Teresa the truth of her own origins, provided she deliver a clairvoyant device to him that Peter had helped develop. Fearing that she is not truly a Parker, Teresa is tempted, but ultimately decides to embrace who she believes herself to be and destroys the Clairvoyant when Peter entrusts her with it, keeping it out of The Finisher's hands.

Pasco

Pathway

Pathway (Laura Dean) is a fictional mutant in the publications of Marvel Comics. She first appeared in Alpha Flight #53 (December 1987) and was created by Bill Mantlo and Jim Lee.

Laura Dean's parents were mutant-phobic and decided to abort Laura's twin fetus because it was a mutant. While still a fetus, Laura protected her twin sister by using her mutant abilities to send her to another dimension, dubbed "Liveworld".

Laura grew up withdrawn from the world. In an attempt to cure her, her parents sent her to the New Life Clinic, which was actually run by the insane villain Scramble. Laura managed to escape but was later caught by Bedlam and forced to become a member of his team of Derangers. During the clash with Alpha Flight, Laura swapped places with her twin, whom she had named Goblyn, in Liveworld.

After Alpha Flight defeated Bedlam, Goblyn and Laura were admitted into Beta Flight under the misbelief that they were the same person. However, this was all sorted out when Alpha Flight travelled to Liveworld and there encountered the Dreamqueen. When they returned to Earth, and Alpha disbanded, Laura and Goblyn went to live with Purple Girl.

They re-joined Beta Flight when Talisman dispatched them on a quest for Northstar, thanks to Laura's ability to open portals to other dimensions. The two stayed on when the team was once again funded by the government and Department H was re-formed. However, both were severely injured when Wild Child went insane and attacked them. Laura sent Goblyn instinctively to Liveworld and had to return with Beta Flight to save her.

Patriot

Jeffrey Mace

Eli Bradley

Rayshaun Lucas

Peepers

Penance

Peregrine

Persuasion

Perun

Pestilence

F.R. Crozier

Ichisumi

Petra
Petra is a fictional character appearing in the comic books published by Marvel Comics. Petra first appears in the limited series X-Men: Deadly Genesis #1 (2006) and was created by writer Ed Brubaker and artist Pete Woods. She is one of the "Missing X-Men". The word "petra" means "rocky" in Latin, and "stone" in Greek.

Petra was the first of her family to be born in the United States. Her mother, father, and brother emigrated from Denmark while her mother was pregnant with Petra. They lived the typical American life in the suburbs of New York City for most of Petra's childhood. Shortly after her thirteenth birthday, Petra's family was killed by a rockslide while on a camping trip. Unknowingly, Petra used her mutant powers of earth manipulation to avoid getting hurt.

After spending weeks in Child Protective Services, Petra was sent to live in New Jersey in a foster home. She was placed in a home that had five other children that were forced to share the same bedroom. Her foster mother was old and uncaring, and her foster father was too caring, trying to hold and touch Petra all the time. One day on an outing to Central Park, Petra's foster father tried to touch her but sank knee-deep into the ground. It was then that Petra realized that she was a mutant, and she ran away. She found a cave and hid there for days crying, knowing that with her abilities she could have either killed or saved her family.

She camped in Central Park for a couple of years, using her power to manipulate rock caves into shelters to avoid being arrested and sent to juvenile detention centers. When she was sixteen, she discovered another useful aspect of her ability: she could turn coal into diamonds by concentrating hard enough. For a year, she used this aspect of her power to make diamonds of varying sizes to sell to pawn shops so she could buy food and survive.

One day, however, a pawn shop employee said he was going to call the owner of the store, but he called the police. Running to her rock shelter, the police found Petra before she could hide, and took her into custody after a brief battle. When she awoke, a female guard informed her that she was being released into the custody of a woman, later revealed to be Dr. Moira MacTaggert, who was there to help Petra. This at first frightened Petra because she had never known anyone to try to help her because of her abilities, only hurt her.

After some time with Dr. MacTaggert, Professor Charles Xavier took Petra and the other children within custody (Sway, Darwin, and Vulcan) to rescue the original X-Men team trapped on the mutant island Krakoa. Petra instinctively used her powers to bury Vulcan and Darwin, and then gets incinerated by the volcano creature that was created by Krakoa.

When the X-Men establish Krakoa as a mutant paradise, Petra was among the revived mutants living there, She, Sway, and Vulcan was residing in the Summer House.

During the "Empyre" storyline, Petra and Sway have a drink with Vulcan at the Summer House on the Moon. After Vulcan defeated his Cotati attackers, Petra and Sway catch up to him.

Petra was a "terrakinetic" or "geo-morph", having the ability to psychokinetically manipulate, control, levitate and reshape the classic element of earth—sand, stone, rock, lava, and/or dirt—and could even transform the consistency of earth and rock, such as turning a lump of coal into a diamond. She also could use this power to cause minor earthquakes and create shapes out of solid rock.

Petra in other media
A character based on Petra named Christy Nord appears in Wolverine and the X-Men, voiced by Kari Wahlgren. This version is the geokinetic daughter of Christopher Nord who lives on a farm near the U.S.-Canadian border. In flashbacks depicted in the episode "Past Discretions", Wolverine was tasked by Weapon X to kidnap Christopher, but stopped upon realizing he would make Christy an orphan. Nonetheless, Sabretooth completed the mission, leading to Christopher being brainwashed. In the present, Christy attacks Wolverine, believing he killed her father, before realizing the truth. In the episode "Stolen Lives", Christy is abducted by Christopher, but is rescued by Wolverine and Mystique. Afterward, Emma Frost undoes Christopher's brainwashing, allowing the Nords to reunite.

Mike Peterson

Phage
Phage is the name used by a symbiote in Marvel Comics. The symbiote, created by David Michelinie and Ron Lim, first appeared in Venom: Lethal Protector #4 (May 1993), and was named in Carnage, U.S.A. #2 (March 2012) due to an unrelated character from the Venom: The Hunted comic storyline and Venom: Along Came A Spider toy line. It was created as one of five symbiote "children" forcefully spawned from the Venom symbiote along with Riot, Agony, Lasher and Scream. Phage primarily sports symbiote spikes.

Phage's first host was Carl Mach, a mercenary hired alongside Scream (Donna Diego), Agony (Leslie Gesneria), Lasher (Ramon Hernandez) and Riot (Trevor Cole) by Carlton Drake's Life Foundation in San Francisco. Phage and his four symbiote "siblings" are defeated by Spider-Man and Venom. The hosts kidnap Eddie Brock in an attempt to communicate with their symbiotes in Chicago. Brock refuses to aid them while the hosts are killed by Diego.

Phage's second host was Rico Axelson, a Lieutenant assigned alongside Riot (Howard Odgen), Lasher (Marcus Simms), and Agony (James Murphy) to the Mercury Team. With Cletus Kasady on the loose in Colorado, Phage and the Team Mercury assist Spider-Man, Scorn and Flash Thompson. However, Phage and his teammates are killed by Carnage in their secret base, and the four symbiotes bond with Mercury Team's dog.

After being possessed by Knull, the four symbiotes possess a bickering family, with Phage taking the son Billy. The group head to New York to assist in Carnage's quest and hunt Dylan Brock and Normie Osborn but are defeated and separated from their hosts by the Maker. Under Knull's possession, Phage merges with his "siblings" into one, but is defeated by Andi Benton. 

Phage's fourth and fifth hosts are Buck Cashman initially and a hunting dog subsequently. Led by the Carnage symbiote, Phage and the other three symbiote enforcers participate in a conspiracy involving the Friends of Humanity, only to be defeated by Thompson, Silence and Toxin, and taken into in Alchemax's custody.

Phage in other media
 The Carl Mach incarnation of Phage appears as a boss in Spider-Man and Venom: Separation Anxiety.
 The Carl Mach incarnation of Phage appears as a playable character in Spider-Man Unlimited.

Phantazia

Phantom Eagle

Phantom Reporter

Phantom Rider

Carter Slade

Jamie Jacobs

Lincoln Slade

Reno Jones

Hamilton Slade

J. T. Slade

Jaime Slade

Phaser

Phastos

Phat

Chester Phillips

Chester Phillips is a World War II general in the Marvel Universe. The character, created by Stan Lee and Jack Kirby, first appeared in Tales of Suspense #63 (March 1965).

Within the context of the stories, General Chester Phillips is one of the army officers overseeing subject selection for Project: Rebirth. He takes a personal interest in Steve Rogers as the best candidate for the first test. Both he and Abraham Erskine refuse to allow General Maxfield Saunders to have Clinton McIntyre receive the first full treatment. When Saunders steals the serum and apparently kills McIntyre, Phillips has the body shipped away and Saunders arrested.

Chester Phillips in other media
 Chester Phillips appears in The Marvel Super Heroes.
 Chester Phillips appears in The Avengers: Earth's Mightiest Heroes.
 Chester Phillips appears in media set in the Marvel Cinematic Universe (MCU), portrayed by Tommy Lee Jones. First appearing in the live-action film Captain America: The First Avenger, this version is a colonel, leader of the Strategic Scientific Reserve (SSR), and a co-founder of S.H.I.E.L.D. Additionally, an alternate timeline version of Phillips appears in the Disney+ animated series What If...? episode "What If... Captain Carter Were the First Avenger?", in which he is shot and killed by Heinz Kruger and succeeded by John Flynn.

Phobos

Phoenix Force

Phone Ranger

Photon

Monica Rambeau

Genis-Vell

Piecemeal

Gilbert Benson

Cyborg
Piecemeal was a cyborg created in a secret Amazon laboratory by a scientific team supervised by the Red Skull. Piecemeal was assembled from a combination of human and animal corpses and high-tech weaponry for the purpose of being the ultimate killing machine. Before the Red Skull could fully program Piecemeal's mind, the Hulk attacked the laboratory, but Piecemeal escaped in the confusion. The mindless Piecemeal wandered through the Amazon before stowing away on a cargo plane en route to Scotland. A retired Pantheon member residing on Loch Ness later summoned the Hulk when Piecemeal began attacking tourists and draining their minds. Piecemeal battled the Hulk – during which he revealed his ability to duplicate the Hulk's appearance and powers – and was apparently killed.

Alexander Goodwin Pierce

Donald Pierce

Piledriver

Pink Pearl

Pinky Pinkerton

Pip the Troll

Pipeline

Piper

Piranha

Pisces

Noah Perricone

Life Model Decoy

Second Life Model Decoy

Female Life Model Decoy

Ecliptic

Thanos' Pisces

Pixie

Plague
Plague was originally a member of the Morlocks before joining the Horsemen of Apocalypse.

Plantman

Plunderer

Pluto

Pod

Poison
Poison (Cecilia Cardinale) is a fictional character appearing in American comic books published by Marvel Comics. The character was created by writer Steve Gerber and artist Cynthia Martin. Poison first appeared in Web of Spider-Man Annual #4 (1988).

Polestar

Porcupine

Alexander Gentry

Roger Gocking

Billy Bates

Portal

Possessor

Post
Kevin Tremain was a mutant captured and studied by the Mandarin. His first appearance was in X-Men (vol. 2) #50. On a secret mission, the Six Pack attacked the secret base Tremain was held in. Tremain was mortally injured; Cable tried to save his life, first by using his telekinesis to keep Tremain's body together, and finally by giving him a blood transfusion. Although it seems he survived this trauma, Cable seemed to think Tremain had later died.

Years later, Tremain resurfaced as Post, the lowest of Onslaught's emissaries. Post had superhuman size, strength, stamina, and sturdiness. He was also a mathematical genius. After being infected with the T-O virus via blood transfusion from Cable, Post became a cyborg, who was also able to generate energy discharges, cloaking fields, biogenetic scanners and teleport himself to remote locations.

Postman

Pepper Potts

Poundcakes

Malcolm Powder

Malcolm Powder first appeared in Alias #6 (April 2002), created by Brian Michael Bendis and Michael Gaydos. Powder was a high school student and a fan of Jessica Jones.

He made his first appearance by breaking into Jessica's apartment and answering her phone. Jessica kicked him out. Later, while Jessica was looking for a Rick Jones (not the famous one), Powder showed up again asking for a job as her personal part-time secretary. He was kicked out once again.

Powder arrived again, this time asking Jessica about the secret identities of Captain America and Daredevil. He asked for a job, and Jessica agreed under the condition that he find information on Mattie Franklin, who was missing. To Jessica's surprise, Powder showed up with a girl named Laney, who claimed her brother was dating Mattie around the time she disappeared. He was last seen answering Jessica's phone as her secretary.

Malcolm Powder in other media
Malcolm Joseph Ducasse appeared in the Netflix series set in the Marvel Cinematic Universe, portrayed by Eka Darville.
Malcolm Ducasse first appears in Jessica Jones. He is a neighbor who lives just down the hall from Jessica's apartment. In the first season, Jessica first meets him when she saves him from two muggers, a meeting she does not recall because that was also the night that Kilgrave first brought her under his control. It is later revealed that Malcolm was planning on getting into social work, but after Jessica escaped from Kilgrave's control, Kilgrave tracked Malcolm down and ordered him to get addicted to drugs, and made him secretly take pictures of Jessica. When Jessica finds out, she leaves Malcolm handcuffed in her bathroom and forces him to go into withdrawal. He soon becomes the leader of a support group for Kilgrave's victims, helps Robyn get closure after Kilgrave kills her brother, stays by Luke's bedside while he's recovering from a concussion, and after Kilgrave is defeated, begins to work for Jessica as her secretary.
Malcolm appeared in The Defenders. He is introduced popping in to Jessica's apartment while she is invested in a missing persons case, much to Jessica's annoyance, and offers a helpful tip that allows Jessica to track down her mysterious caller's location. Later on, John Raymond, learning that Jessica is trying to find him, forces his way into Jessica's apartment and holds Malcolm at gunpoint. Malcolm and Jessica try to talk Raymond into going to the police, but Elektra breaks into the apartment and tries to kill Raymond, who shoots himself rather than let her kill him. Elektra flees the scene while Jessica and Malcolm are arrested by Detective Misty Knight. Misty attempts to interrogate the two for information, but Matt Murdock shows up to bail them out of custody. Later on, when the Hand begin targeting the heroes' loved ones, Jessica has Trish and Malcolm hide with Colleen Wing, Claire Temple, Karen Page and Foggy Nelson at Misty's precinct. After the Hand is defeated, Malcolm is last seen helping Jessica fix up her apartment and painting over the bullet holes left from Jessica and Trish's fight with Simpson.
 In the second season of Jessica Jones, Malcolm continues to be an associate to Jessica and is constantly taking notes of advice from her, regardless of whether they are intentional or not. Jessica uses him to track down leads on IGH as well as settle a tenancy dispute with their new building superintendent Oscar Arocho. When Jessica and Trish find an IGH nurse named Inez Green, they task Malcolm with delivering Inez to Jeri Hogarth. In the midst of the IGH investigation, Malcolm also helps Jeri uncover dirt on her partners who are tried to get her fired. Malcolm later hooks up with Trish and begins a sexual relationship with her, though this ends when Trish, seeking to get powers like Jessica from Dr. Karl Malus, knocks out, ties up and stuffs Malcolm in the trunk of her car when he tries to bring Dr. Malus in. Then finally, she kidnaps Dr. Malus and threatens to shoot Malcolm if he tries to stop her. Fed up with Trish and Jessica using him, Malcolm quits and goes to work for rival private investigator Pryce Cheng, who in turn has been retained by Hogarth's new private law firm.
 In the third season of Jessica Jones, Malcolm continues to work for Hogarth and is in a relationship with a woman named Zaya Okonjo at a party in his new apartment, although he is disturbed by the methods used to help a baseball player client out of town, a drunk driving incident, resulting in another career-damaging accident for the client. Malcolm must protect Erik Gelden's sister, Brianna, who must stay away from Gregory P. Salinger, an intellectually formidable, psychopathic serial killer. Malcolm asks to rejoin Alias Investigations, to which Jessica accepts; assigning him to look into the files of Jace Montero. After breaking up with Zaya, Malcolm begins a relationship with Brianna. After Trish killed Sallinger in the courthouse elevator, Malcolm decides to help Jessica to demand to stop her, and suggested that she involve the police, but if that happened, the public would find out and chase her out of town. After Malcolm saw the news detailing Trish's savage assault on Demetri Patseras, Jessica leaks to the news Trish's identity of her as the masked vigilante. The next morning, a trucker tells Malcolm that he saw Trish in a silver Lexus, and he was heading east where the old airport was located. Malcolm and Erik stay because Jessica wanted to deal with Trish alone. In the end after Trish was arrested, Malcolm sees Jessica go on a trip and she gives him the keys to Alias Investigations and told him not to screw it up.

Powderkeg

Power Broker

Curtiss Jackson

Successor

Power Man

Erik Josten

Luke Cage

Victor Alvarez

Power Princess

Power Skrull

Powerhouse

Rieg Davan

Unnamed

Predator X

Presence
Presence is the name of a fictional character appearing in American comic books published by Marvel Comics.

As a younger man, Sergei Krylov was a Belarusian nuclear physicist born in Minsk, BSSR. His twin children, Nikolai Krylenko and Laynia Petrovna, were taken from birth by the Soviet government to be trained as soldiers, after their mutant natures manifested.

Sergei eventually became one of the most influential men behind the scenes of the Soviet government. However, despite being a scientific genius, he was also quite mad. He caused a Chernobyl-like nuclear disaster in the "Forbidden Zone" using cobalt radiation baths and a nuclear blast, which transformed Tania Belinsky into his super-powered thrall as the second Red Guardian. The nuclear energy transformed Sergei into a superhuman being as well, and he could now generate nuclear energy within his own body for various uses. Sergi began calling himself "The Presence". The Presence and Red Guardian battled the Defenders when they came to find her. The Presence left when she regained her free will and spurned him. Soon after, the Presence battled a giant mutated amoeba in the "Forbidden Zone", and was then reunited and reconciled with Red Guardian.

The government now wanted the threat of the Presence eliminated. His own children had been trained by the government as super-powered soldiers and, unaware of their true relationship, were sent to kill him. Alongside the Red Guardian, Presence encountered the Hulk, Professor Phobos, and the Soviet Super-Soldiers in the "Forbidden Zone". Darkstar and Vanguard learned that the Presence was their father and turned against the Soviet regime, and saved the Presence from Phobos. In order to save the Soviet Union from the dangerous, spreading radiation of the so-called Forbidden Zone, an irradiated Soviet wasteland, the Presence and the Red Guardian absorbed all the radiation into themselves and left for outer space, where they claimed they would transform themselves into inert matter. The twins became agents on their own, fighting for the good of the people, and sometimes working with their father.

The Presence was revealed to be held prisoner with Red Guardian (now calling herself Starlight) on the Stranger's laboratory world. The pair returned to Earth with the Jack of Hearts. The Presence attempted to kill Eon, but was instead trapped in the "Quantum Zone" dimension by Quasar. It was revealed in flashback how Maelstrom had persuaded the Presence to attack Eon. The Presence was eventually rescued from the "Quantum Zone" by Neutron, and teamed with him to seek vengeance on Quasar. The Presence learned of the Soviet Union's collapse, and returned to Russia with the intent to create a "new order". Later, the Presence sent Starlight to capture the Black Widow and Darkstar.

Vanguard was ultimately killed in a battle while he and Darkstar were aiding the cosmic hero Quasar. Darkstar blamed Quasar for her brother's death and fled back to Russia. When she encountered her father, Darkstar shared her feelings with him, and the Presence forced Quasar to flee Earth on the threat of killing Quasar's loved ones. Sergei visited his son's memorial and sought to revive him by shifting his atoms to microscopically enter Vanguard's body.  There he discovered a trace of Vanguard's mutant energy remained, keeping him faintly alive. The Presence managed to use this energy to resurrect his son, but nearly exhausted his own power, and was cast adrift in the subatomic reality he had entered.

While in subatomic exile, the Presence discovered new aspects of his power and atomic particles, and, when he had sufficiently regenerated, resumed his normal size and returned to the Forbidden Zone. There, he embarked on a plan to unite all of the former Soviet Union by transforming its people into a race of zombie-like radioactive beings living under a communal mind. He managed to convert several Siberian scientists, Vanguard and the rest of the Winter Guard, and the Avengers, who investigated the disturbance, leaving only Thor and the seemingly-immortal Firebird to stand against him. As Thor threatened to kill the Presence, Starlight, as the Presence's companion, ultimately offered their surrender and used her own power to revive those who had been transformed and remand herself and the Presence to Russian custody; she did not share his vision, but their powers meant that they would only ever have each other for company, and so she wished to keep him alive. In the final struggle of the Kang War, the Presence and Starlight aided in the struggle to destroy Kang the Conqueror's Damocles Base space station, with Starlight blackmailing the Presence for assistance by threatening to leave him if he attempted anything more than simply doing his job and subsequently returning to his cell.

In the 2010 Darkstar and Winter Guard limited series, The Presence was apparently destroyed permanently when the Russian superhero Powersurge sacrificed his life to defeat him after he once again tried to conquer Russia after Starlight left him for good to join the People's Protectorate, where she fell in love with his son, Vanguard.

In Deadpool and the Mercs for Money, the Presence is briefly revived by Umbral Dynamics (a corporation secretly led by Caroline Le Fay) by harvesting the power of several superhumans with radiation-related powers. After a fight with the new Mercs for Money and Deadpool, the Presence is killed again by Negasonic Teenage Warhead who drains out all his power.

Presence in other media
Presence appears in Lego Marvel Super Heroes 2. Captain America, She-Hulk, and Thor encounter him at a Siberian facility where radiation was high. When Captain America gets infected, Presence controls him and the infected workers until She-Hulk and Thor contain the radiation and free the infected. Before being beaten up by She-Hulk even when the Winter Guard arrived, Presence states that they do not know what is coming.

Prester John

Pretty Boy

Pretty Persuasions

Preview

Primus

Android

Alien

Explorer

Princess Python

Prism

Proctor

Prodigy

Ritchie Gilmore

David Alleyne

Timothy Wilkerson

Professor Power

Professor Thornton

Professor X

The Profile

Prometheus

Olympian

Pantheon

Protector
Protector (Thoral Rul) was the Prime Thoran of Xandar, whose duty was to protect the Xandarian's Living Computers (aka Worldmind). Protector was killed when Nebula's forces wiped out Xandar's population.

Proteus

Protégé

Protégé is a cosmic entity from an alternate future of the Marvel Universe.

The character, created by Jim Valentino, first appeared in Guardians of the Galaxy #15 (August 1991) as the childlike ruler of the Universal Church of Truth of the alternate future of the Guardians of the Galaxy. Valentino modeled him after his son Aaron at seven years old. He is depicted as a superhuman of unlimited potential, with the ability to duplicate not only super-powers, but also the skills of others simply by observing the ability being used; thus, he could acquire the psychokinetic powers of the Guardian Vance Astro as easily as he could the marksmanship ability of Astro's teammate Nikki, by watching them in combat.

Within the context of the Marvel Comics universe, Protégé is the deity and leader of Universal Church of Truth to which Replica, a member of the Guardians of the Galaxy, belongs. In order to save the lives of her teammates, she offers herself as a playmate to Protégé who is accompanied by Malevolence.

Later, Protégé uses its abilities to duplicate the powers of the Living Tribunal, nearly usurping its place in Marvel's cosmology. When attempts to defeat Protégé fail, The Living Tribunal states that any and all realities rest on Protégé's shoulders. Protégé itself claims to have become the new One-Above-All. Scathan the Approver, a Celestial, saves all realities by judging against Protégé. The Living Tribunal then absorbed Protégé into itself to prevent him from endangering all realities again.

Protocide

Proton

Prowler

Hobie Brown

Cat Burglar

Rick Lawson

Aaron Davis

Clone

Kitty Pryde

Madelyne Pryor

Psi-Hawk

Psycho-Man

Psyklop

Psylocke (Betsy Braddock)

Psylocke (Kwannon)

Puck

Eugene Milton Judd

Zuzha Yu

Puff Adder

Pulsar

Pulsar, originally code-named Impulse, is a member of the Shi'ar Imperial Guard. Created by Chris Claremont and Dave Cockrum, the character first appeared in X-Men #107 (October 1977). An energy being in a containment suit, Pulsar is capable of flight and the projection of energy blasts. (Like many original members of the Imperial Guard, Pulsar is the analog of a character from DC Comics' Legion of Super-Heroes: in his case Wildfire.)

Impulse was amongst the first of the Imperial Guard encountered by the team of superhuman mutants known as the X-Men who sought to rescue the Princess Lilandra from her insane brother emperor D'Ken. Following the orders of their emperor, the Guard clashed with the X-Men on a nameless Shi'ar Empire planet and were on the verge of winning when the band of interstellar freebooters known as the Starjammers arrived to turn the tide of battle in the X-Men's favor. After the battle, Lilandra takes over as Majestrix, and the Guard swears allegiance to her.

He is with the Guard when they come into conflict with a rogue Space Knight named Pulsar and an alien named Tyreseus. After a large battle which also involves Rom and other Space Knights — which leads to the deaths of four new Guardsman — Pulsar and Tyreseus are defeated.

Impulse is again part of the mission during Operation: Galactic Storm, an intergalactic war between the Shi'ar and the Kree. The Imperial Guard are integral to the Sh'iar creating a massive super weapon — the "Nega-Bomb" — using Kree artifacts, including the original Captain Marvel's Nega-Bands, which the Guard steals from the dead hero's tomb. This bomb is capable of devastating an area equivalent to that of the Kree Empire (which is supposedly located throughout the Large Magellanic Cloud). Ultimately, the Nega Bomb device is successfully detonated, devastating the Kree Empire, with billions dying instantaneously (98% of the Kree population). The Shi'ar annex the remnants of the Kree Empire, with Deathbird becoming viceroy of the Kree territories.

Ronan the Accuser subsequently leads the Kree in a surprise attack against the Shi'ar, using the Inhumans as an army to disrupt the Shi'ar control of the Kree. Appearing over the city of Attilan, Ronan seizes control in a surprise attack and forces the Inhumans and their king, Black Bolt, to obey, or he would destroy their only home and everyone in it. He compels Karnak, Gorgon, and Triton to covertly join the Imperial Guard, while Black Bolt and Medusa attempt the assassination of the Shi'ar ruler Lilandra at a ceremony ratifying an alliance between the Shi'ar and the Spartoi. Black Bolt manages to defeat Ronan in personal combat. the attempt on Lilandra's life fails because the shapeshifting Imperial Guardsman Hobgoblin dies in her place.

The character is seemingly killed by Vulcan in the Emperor Vulcan storyline. Vulcan, a powerful mutant intent on conquering the Shi'ar Empire, fights the Guard, killing Cosmo and Smasher (and seemingly Impulse, Neutron, and Titan) before he is defeated by Gladiator, who puts out his left eye. It turns out that Impulse either survived Vulcan's attack or was replaced by someone from the Subguardian ranks, because he reappears in the War of Kings storyline. Beginning with the Infinity crossover, the character's name was changed to Pulsar.

Pulsar has many further adventures with the Imperial Guard, including being involved in the trial of Jean Grey and the return of Thanos.

Pulse

Puma

Punchout

Punisher

Punisher 2099

Puppet Master

Purple Man

Henry Pym

Hope Pym

Pyre

Pyro

References

Marvel Comics characters: P, List of